Aframomum aulacocarpos is a monocotyledonous plant species described by François Pellegrin and Jean Koechlin. Aframomum aulacocarpos is part of the genus Aframomum and the family Zingiberaceae. No subspecies are listed in the Catalog of Life.

References 

aulacocarpos
Flora of Africa
Plants described in 1964
Taxa named by François Pellegrin